John Gore (c. 1689–1763) of Bush Hill, Middlesex was a politician who sat in the House of Commons between 1747 and 1761.

Family
Gore was born c.1689, the second son of William Gore (Lord Mayor of London) by Elizabeth Hampton, daughter of Walter Hampton.  He was brother to Thomas Gore (died 1777) and William Gore who were also British MPs.  Gore married and had issue.  His daughter Catherine married her cousin, MP Joseph Mellish; his daughter Anne married Joseph's brother, William Mellish MP

Career
Gore was a merchant and in a business partnership with Joseph Mellish who subsequently became his son-in-law.  He was director of the South Sea Company from 1711-1712 and 1715 to 1721. He was elected Member of Parliament for Great Grimsby and served from 1747 to 1761.
 
Gore died on 3 August 1763.

References

1680s births
1763 deaths
British MPs 1747–1754
British MPs 1754–1761